The River Forth is a major river in central Scotland,  long, which drains into the North Sea on the east coast of the country. Its drainage basin covers much of Stirlingshire in Scotland's Central Belt. The Gaelic name for the upper reach of the river, above Stirling, is Abhainn Dubh, meaning "black river". The name for the river below the tidal reach (just past where it is crossed by the M9 motorway) is Uisge For.

Name
Forth derives from Proto-Celtic *Vo-rit-ia (slow running), yielding Foirthe in Old Gaelic.

Course

Ben Lomond's eastern slopes drain into the Duchray Water, which meets with Avondhu River coming from Loch Ard. The confluence of these two streams is the nominal start of the River Forth. From there it flows roughly eastward through Aberfoyle, joining with the Kelty Water about 5 km further downstream. It then flows into the flat expanse of the Carse of Stirling, including Flanders Moss. Just west of the M9, it is joined by the River Teith (which itself drains Loch Venachar, Loch Lubnaig, Loch Achray, Loch Katrine, and Loch Voil). The next tributary is the Allan Water, just east of the M9. From there the Forth meanders into the ancient port of Stirling. At Stirling the river widens and becomes tidal. This is the location of the last (seasonal) ford of the river. From Stirling, the Forth flows east, accepting the Bannock Burn from the south before passing the town of Fallin. It then passes two towns in Clackmannanshire: firstly Cambus (where it is joined by the River Devon), closely followed by Alloa. Upon reaching Airth (on the river’s south shore) and Kincardine (on its north shore), the river begins to widen and becomes the Firth of Forth.

Settlements on the river 

The banks have many settlements along them, including Aberfoyle, Gargunnock, Stirling, Fallin, Cambus, Throsk, Alloa, South Alloa, Dunmore, Airth, and Kincardine. Beyond these settlements, the water turns brackish, and is usually considered part of the Firth of Forth.

Port activities 

In the sixteenth and seventeenth centuries, Stirling harbour was a busy port, with goods coming into Scotland and being exported to Europe. As a result, Stirling had very close ties with the Hansa towns, with Bruges in Belgium, and with Veere (known at the time as Campvere) in the Netherlands. After 1707, trade with America became the new focus, and so a lot of trade activity shifted from Stirling in the east to the port of Glasgow in the west. During World Wars I and II, Stirling harbour began thriving again: It became a gateway for importing supplies of tea into Scotland. After the wars, other trade activities slowly returned, but growth was slow because the harbour’s owners levied heavy shore duties on shipping, making it less economically attractive to the few agricultural merchants who were based at Stirling. Today, Stirling's harbour has fallen into disuse, but there are plans to redevelop it.

Bridges 

Upstream from Stirling, the river is rather narrow and can be crossed in numerous places. (Crossing used to be more difficult before the installation of modern drainage works, because the ground was often treacherously marshy near the riverbank.) However, after its confluence with the Teith and Allan, the river becomes wide enough that a substantial bridge is required. At Stirling, there has been a bridge over the river since at least the 13th century, and it was the easternmost road crossing until 1936, when another road crossing was opened at Kincardine. The Clackmannanshire Bridge, just upstream of the Kincardine Bridge, opened on 19 November 2008. A railway bridge, the Alloa Swing Bridge, previously connected Alloa on the northern shore with Throsk on the southern shore. It opened in 1885 and was closed and mostly demolished in 1970: Only the metal piers remain.

Much further downstream, joining North Queensferry and South Queensferry, is another railway bridge, the famous Forth Bridge, which opened in 1890, and the Forth Road Bridge, which opened in 1964. To the west of the Forth Road Bridge is Queensferry Crossing, construction of which began in 2011: It finally opened on 4 September 2017.

Islands

Two islands (known as “inches”) lie in the meandering estuarine waters downstream from Stirling: Tullibody Inch, near Cambus, and Alloa Inch, near Alloa. Both islands are fairly small, and are uninhabited.

On film and TV
 River Forth (1956): A silent, 15-minute, black-and-white film that includes scenes of animals being herded through the streets.
Britain's Lost Routes with Griff Rhys Jones (2012): Episode 3 explores the difficulties that cattle drovers might have encountered at Frew, shows cows being taken across the Auld Brig, and includes aerial shots.
Sruth gu Sal, Episode 1: A 25-minute look at the Forth River (2 Nov 2009).

See also
275 kV Forth Crossing
List of rivers of Scotland
Rivers and Fisheries Trusts of Scotland (RAFTS)
Shipping Forecast

References

External links

Scottish Parliament: Forth Crossing Bill Committee Report, March 2010
River Forth Crossing: House of Commons debates 18 May 2009
British Waterways: River Forth
Gazetteer for Scotland: River Forth
SCRAN image: Steam dredger, River forth, late 19th Century
Stirling Council: River Forth
Forth Ports PLC
Scottish Environment Protection Agency (SEPA): River level data for River Forth
Forth Estuary Forum, a Scottish Charity
Forth District Salmon Fishery Board
River Forth Fisheries Trust
Forth Bridges Visitor Centre Trust
FYCA Alloa Swing Bridge
RIVER FORTH (1956) FORTH - POWERHOUSE FOR INDUSTRY (1968) (archive films about the River Forth from the National Library of Scotland: Scottish Screen Archive)

Forth
Forth
Tourist attractions in Stirling (council area)